Chile at the 1896 Summer Olympics in Athens, Greece lays Chile's claim to being 1 of 14 nations to have competed at the inaugural Summer Olympic Games, the only South American founding participant. One athlete, Luis Subercaseaux. claimed to have competed for Chile although it cannot be substantiated because the Official Report typically includes only medal winners which Subercaseaux won none.

Athletics

References
 

Nations at the 1896 Summer Olympics
1896
Olympics
Olympics